Labour Day (Labor Day in the United States) is an annual holiday to celebrate the achievements of workers. Labour Day has its origins in the labour union movement, specifically the eight-hour day movement, which advocated eight hours for work, eight hours for recreation, and eight hours for rest.

For most countries, Labour Day is synonymous with, or linked with, International Workers' Day, which occurs on 1 May. For other countries, Labour Day is celebrated on a different date, often one with special significance for the labour movement in that country. Labour Day is a public holiday in many countries.

International Workers' Day

For most countries, "Labour Day" is synonymous with, or linked with, International Workers' Day, which occurs on 1 May. Some countries vary the actual date of their celebrations so that the holiday occurs on a Monday close to 1 May.

Some countries have a holiday at or around this date, but it is not a 'Labour day' celebration.

Other dates

Australia

Labour Day in Australia is a public holiday on dates which vary between states and territories. In some states the date commemorates the Eight Hours Day march (see below). It is the first Monday in October in the Australian Capital Territory, New South Wales and South Australia. In Victoria and Tasmania, it is the second Monday in March (though the latter calls it Eight Hours Day). In Western Australia, Labour Day is the first Monday in March. In Queensland and the Northern Territory, Labour Day occurs on the first Monday in May (though the latter calls it May Day). It is on the fourth Monday of March in the territory of Christmas Island.

The first march for an eight-hour day by the labour movement occurred in Melbourne on 21 April 1856. On this day stonemasons and building workers on building sites around Melbourne stopped work and marched from the University of Melbourne to Parliament House to achieve an eight-hour day. Their direct action protest was a success, and they are noted as being among the first organized workers in the world to achieve an 8-hour day, with no loss of pay.

Bangladesh 
Bangladesh Garment Sramik Sanghati, an organization working for the welfare of garment workers, has requested that 24 April be declared Labour Safety Day in Bangladesh, in memory of the victims of the Rana Plaza building collapse.

Bahamas
Labour Day is a national holiday in the Bahamas, celebrated on the first Friday in June in order to create a long weekend for workers. The traditional date of Labour Day in the Bahamas, however, is 7 June, in commemoration of a significant workers' strike that began on that day in 1942. Labour Day is meant to honor and celebrate workers and the importance of their contributions to the nation and society. In the capital city, Nassau, thousands of people come to watch a parade through the streets, which begins at mid-morning. Bands in colourful uniforms, traditional African junkanoo performers, and members of various labour unions and political parties are all part of the procession, which ends up at the Southern Recreation Grounds, where government officials make speeches for the occasion. For many residents and visitors to the Bahamas, the afternoon of Labour Day is a time to relax at home or perhaps visit the beach.

Canada

Labour Day (French: Fête du Travail) has been marked as a statutory public holiday in Canada on the first Monday in September since 1894. However, the origins of Labour Day in Canada can be traced back to numerous local demonstrations and celebrations in earlier decades. Such events assumed political significance in 1872, when a labour demonstration in Toronto in April 1872, in support of striking printers, led directly to the enactment of the Trade Union Act, a law that confirmed the legality of unions. Ten years later, on 22 July 1882, a huge labour celebration in Toronto attracted the attention of the American labour leader Peter J. McGuire, who organized a similar parade in New York City on 5 September that year. Unions associated with the Knights of Labor and the American Federation of Labor in both Canada and the United States subsequently promoted parades and festivals on the first Monday in September. In Canada, local celebrations took place in Hamilton, Oshawa, Montreal, St Catharines, Halifax, Ottawa, Vancouver and London during these years. Montreal declared a civic holiday in 1889. In Nova Scotia, coal miners had been holding picnics and parades since 1880 to celebrate the anniversary of their union, the Provincial Workmen's Association, first organized in 1879. In addition, in 1889, the Royal Commission on the Relations of Labor and Capital in Canada recommended recognition of an official "labour day" by the federal government. In March and April 1894, unions lobbied Parliament to recognize Labour Day as a public holiday. Legislation was introduced in May by Prime Minister Sir John Thompson and received royal assent in July 1894.

China
1 May is a statutory holiday in the People's Republic of China. It was a three-day holiday until 2008, but was only one day between 2008 and 2019, and was restored to three days after 2019. However, the actual time off is often longer than the time off in the regulations, and the extra time off is usually supplemented by another two weekends, but since the extra time is not under an official holiday, the extra days must be "made up" by working on the preceding or following weekend. For example, in 2013, 1 May fell on Wednesday. Most workplaces, including all government offices, took Monday 29 April, Tuesday 30 April, and Wednesday 1 May off. As the first two days were not statutory holidays they had to be "made up" by working the preceding weekend (27 and 28 April).

Hong Kong S.A.R.
In Hong Kong, 1 May is known as Labour Day and has been considered a public holiday since 1999.

Jamaica
Before 1961, 24 May was celebrated in Jamaica as Empire Day in honour of the birthday of Queen Victoria and her emancipation of slaves in Jamaica. As its name suggests, the day was used to celebrate the British Empire, complete with flag-raising ceremonies and the singing of patriotic songs. In 1961, Jamaican Chief Minister Norman Washington Manley proposed the replacement of Empire Day with Labour Day, a celebration in commemoration of 23 May 1938, when Alexander Bustamante led a labour rebellion leading to Jamaican independence.

In 1972, Jamaican Prime Minister Michael Manley promoted Labour Day as a showcase for the importance of labour to the development of Jamaica, and a day of voluntary community participation to beneficial projects. Since then, Labour Day has been not only a public holiday but also a day of mass community involvement around the country.

Japan
In Japan, Labour Day is officially conflated with Thanksgiving on 23 November, as Labor Thanksgiving Day.

Kazakhstan 
Labour Day in Kazakhstan is celebrated on the last Sunday in September. The holiday was officially established in late 2013. In 1995, the government of Kazakhstan replaced International Workers' Day with Kazakhstan People's Unity Day. Kazakh President Nursultan Nazarbayev also instituted a special medal that is awarded to veterans of labour on the occasion of the holiday. Labour Day it is widely celebrated across the country with official speeches, award ceremonies, cultural events, etc. It is a non-working holiday for most citizens of Kazakhstan because it always falls on a weekend.

Macau S.A.R.
In Macau, it is a public holiday and is officially known as Dia do Trabalhador (Portuguese for "Workers' Day").

New Zealand
In New Zealand, Labour Day is a public holiday held on the fourth Monday in October. Its origins are traced back to the eight-hour working day movement that arose in the newly founded Wellington colony in 1840, primarily because of carpenter Samuel Parnell's refusal to work more than eight hours a day. That year, Parnell reportedly told a prospective employer: "There are twenty-four hours per day given us; eight of these should be for work, eight for sleep, and the remaining eight for recreation".

The first Labour Day in New Zealand was celebrated on October 28, 1890, which marked the first anniversary of the Maritime Council, an organization of transport and mining unions. Several thousand trade union members and supporters attended parades in the main city centres. Government employees were given the day off to attend, and many businesses closed for at least part of the day. Initially, the day was variously called Labour Day or Labour Demonstration Day.

In 1899, the government legislated that the day be a public holiday through the Labour Day Act of 1899. The day was set as the second Wednesday in October and first celebrated the following year, in 1900. In 1910 the holiday was moved to the fourth Monday in October.

Taiwan
1 May is known as Labour Day in Taiwan, an official holiday, though not everybody gets a day off. Students and teachers do not have this day off.

Trinidad and Tobago
In Trinidad and Tobago, Labour Day is celebrated every 19 June. This holiday was proposed in 1973 to be commemorated on the anniversary of the 1937 Butler labour riots.

United States

In the United States, Labor Day is a federal holiday observed on the first Monday of September. It is customarily viewed as the end of the summer vacation season. Many schools open for the year on the day after Labor Day.

References

External links

ToadShow Labour Day photographs, State Library of Queensland. Collection of photographs showing Labour Day events in Brisbane, Ipswich, Gold Coast and Barcaldine between 1998 and 2012.

Types of secular holidays
March observances
April observances
May observances
June observances
September observances
October observances
Monday observances
Holidays and observances by scheduling (nth weekday of the month)
 
Public holidays in Algeria
Public holidays in Cambodia
Public holidays in Turkey
Public holidays in Zambia